Zuckerberg is a Jewish surname of German and Yiddish origin meaning "sugar mountain". People with the surname include:

 Debbie Rosenberg (born Debbie Zuckerberg, 1969), American bridge player
 Donna Zuckerberg (born 1987), American writer and classical scholar
 Mark Zuckerberg (born 1984), American programmer and internet entrepreneur, founder of Facebook
 Randi Zuckerberg (born 1982), American psychologist and entrepreneur, former marketing director of Facebook
 Regina Zuckerberg (1888–1964), Austrian-American Yiddish theatre actress

See also 
 Zuckerberg (disambiguation)
 Zuckermann
 Zucker (disambiguation)
 Cukierman

References

German-language surnames
Jewish surnames
Yiddish-language surnames